This is a list of the highest railways by country. It includes the name of the railway, its highest point and highest elevation and its opening year.

List

See also
Rail transport
List of highest railways in the world
List of countries by highest point

Notes

References

Highest railways by country
Railways
Railways
 Railway